Vladislav Alekseyevich Lekomtsev (born 8 December 1994) is a Russian para-cross-country skier and para-biathlete. During the 2014 Winter Paralympics he won a gold medal in 7.5 km biathlon race and then won bronze one for the 20 km cross country skiing at the same place.

Biography
Vladislav Lekomtsev was born on 8 December 1994 in Romashkino, Alnashsky District, Udmurtia to Tamara Yakovlevna Lekomtseva and Aleksey Lekomtsev. Starting from elementary school, he and his three siblings worked part-time on a collective farm during their summer holidays to earn clothes and school supplies. On 8 August 2007, he lost his left arm and fractured the other one in an accident with a tractor, when he helped his father.

In 2009, Lekomtsev started practicing association football and athletics until his mother helped him to choose skiing.

He is a student of Udmurt State University in Izhevsk, where he is studying psychology.

He won the gold medal in the men's 12.5km standing cross-country skiing event at the 2021 World Para Snow Sports Championships held in Lillehammer, Norway. He also won the gold medal in the men's long-distance standing cross-country skiing event. In biathlon, he won the gold medal in the men's 6km standing event. He also won the gold medal in the men's 10km standing biathlon event.

Personal life
He is in a serious relationship with his girlfriend, Varvara Reshetnikova. They had been friends at school before starting to date in March 2013. On 22 February 2015, the couple welcomed their first child, a son they named Timofey.

Awards 
 Order "For Merit to the Fatherland", 4th class (17 March 2014) – for the huge contribution to the development of physical culture and sports, and for the high athletic performances at the 2014 Paralympic Winter Games in Sochi
 Merited Master of Sports of Russia (11 March 2014)

References

External links
Vladislav Lekomtsev - IPC Nordic Skiing | Paralympic Athlete Profile

1994 births
Living people
Paralympic bronze medalists for Russia
Paralympic gold medalists for Russia
Biathletes at the 2014 Winter Paralympics
Cross-country skiers at the 2014 Winter Paralympics
Russian male biathletes
Paralympic biathletes of Russia
People from Alnashsky District
Russian male cross-country skiers
Paralympic cross-country skiers of Russia
People without hands
Russian amputees
Russian disabled sportspeople
Sportspeople from Udmurtia
Medalists at the 2014 Winter Paralympics
Paralympic medalists in cross-country skiing
Paralympic medalists in biathlon